The Castleton Medical College Building, now known as the Old Chapel, is a historic building of the Castleton Medical College on Seminary Street in Castleton, Vermont, United States. Founded in 1818, it was the first medical college in  Vermont, and the first private degree-granting medical school in the United States.  The chapel-like building was built in 1821, and is now the oldest building on the campus of Castleton University.  Its current use is for special meetings and performances for Castleton University.  It was listed on the National Register of Historic Places in 1971.

Description and history
The former Castleton Medical College Building stands on the Castleton University campus, between Seminary and Elm Streets.  It is a two-story wooden structure, with timber framing enclosed by wooden clapboards, and a gabled roof.  A projecting vestibule has a lower roof line than the main block, with a fully pedimented gable end, and the main entrance in a recess flanked by pilasters and topped by an entablature.  At the front of the main roof a two-stage tower rises, square in the first stage, and with an open octagonal cupola above.

Castleton Medical College was founded in 1818, and this building was constructed in 1821.  It is believed to be the oldest surviving medical school building in the United States.  It was moved a short distance in the 20th century to make way for new construction on the CU campus.  It now houses classroom facilities for the university's art department.

Notable alumni of Castleton Medical College
Smith A. Boughton, leader of the Anti-Rent War
Charles M. Crandall, physician and member of the New York State Assembly
Samuel Denton, physician and politician in Michigan
Isaiah H. Hedge, physician, Baptist philanthropist at Bates College
Robert M. Hunt, California physician
John Gould Stephenson, physician and soldier, Librarian of Congress
Socrates Hotchkiss Tryon Sr., pioneer physician, philanthropist

See also
National Register of Historic Places listings in Rutland County, Vermont

References

Buildings and structures in Castleton, Vermont
Castleton University
School buildings completed in 1821
University and college buildings on the National Register of Historic Places in Vermont
National Register of Historic Places in Rutland County, Vermont
Historic district contributing properties in Vermont
1821 establishments in Vermont